Ribeirão Corrente is a municipality in the state of São Paulo in Brazil. The population is 4,752 (2020 est.) in an area of 148 km2. The elevation is 855 m.

References

Municipalities in São Paulo (state)